The Victoria Cross (VC) is the highest award of the United Kingdom honours system. It is awarded for gallantry "in the face of the enemy" to members of the British armed forces. It may be awarded posthumously. It was previously awarded to Commonwealth countries, most of which have established their own honours systems and no longer recommend British honours. It may be awarded to a person of any military rank in any service and to civilians under military command although no civilian has received the award since 1879. Since the first awards were presented by Queen Victoria in 1857, two thirds of all awards have been personally presented by the British monarch. These investitures are usually held at Buckingham Palace.

Background

Established in 1856, the Victoria Cross has been awarded to service personnel for extraordinary valour and devotion to duty while facing a hostile force. Between 1858 and 1881 the Victoria Cross could also be awarded for actions taken "under circumstances of extreme danger" not in the face of the enemy. Six people were awarded Victoria Crosses under this clause – one Irish man in 1866 for actions taken during the Fenian raids; five (a Canadian, three Irish and an English man) for a single incident in 1867 during the Andaman Islands Expedition. In 1881, VC regulations were amended to only allow acts "in the presence of the enemy".

Since 1993, Canadians have no longer been eligible for the Victoria Cross: that medal has been superseded by the Canadian Victoria Crossof equal honour, but yet to be awarded. The scroll of the Canadian medal differs in that the inscription is in Latin rather than English; by using a language that is an ancestor of French and has greatly contributed to the development of English, the medal avoids linguistic discrimination between Canada's two official languages. The fleur-de-lis, in heraldry long associated with the French crown has been added at the end each scroll. The actual metal of the medal is a distinct Canadian composition.

Summary

The Victoria Cross has been presented to 99 Canadians, or people closely associated with Canada, between its creation for acts performed during the Crimean War and 1993 when the Canadian Victoria Cross was instituted. No Canadian has received either honour since 1945.

The first Canadian to be awarded the Victoria Cross was Alexander Roberts Dunn for his actions at the Battle of Balaclava during the Crimean War in 1854. William Hall, a Nova Scotian, was the first black recipient of the Victoria Cross. The last living Canadian recipient of the British Victoria Cross, "Smokey" Smith, died in August 2005.

Seventy-three Victoria Crosses were awarded to Canadians for their actions in the First World War, and Canadians received sixteen VCs during the Second World War. The remaining recipients were awarded the medal for actions performed in the Crimean War (Battle of Balaclava), the Indian Mutiny (the Indian Rebellion of 1857), a native uprising at a remote Indian Ocean island during the Andaman Islands Expedition, the Battle of Omdurman during the Sudan Campaign of 1896–1899, and the Second Boer War.

Timothy O'Hea, a 23-year-old Irishman in the British army, fought a fire in a railway car containing 900 kilograms of ammunition stationed at Danville, Quebec during the Fenian raids. O'Hea is the only VC recipient awarded for actions on Canadian soil.

Seven Canadians were awarded VCs individually on one single day, 2 September 1918, for actions they performed along the 30 km long Drocourt-Quéant Line near Arras, France: Bellenden Hutcheson, Arthur George Knight, William Henry Metcalf, Claude Nunney, Cyrus Wesley Peck, Walter Leigh Rayfield and John Francis Young. Their acts of exceptional valour were performed during Canada's Hundred Days of successful offensive campaigning that helped end the war.

Recipients 

(This list is arranged alphabetically when first opened but the order can be changed to other criteria such as date of valourous action, by clicking in box at top of each column.)

See also

 Canadian order of precedence (decorations and medals)
 Persons of National Historic Significance
 List of Canadian awards

Notes

References

Canada
Canada and the Commonwealth of Nations

Victoria Cross